"Mitt hjärta blöder" is a single by Swedish singer Veronica Maggio, from her third studio album Satan i gatan. It was released in Sweden as a digital download on 25 January 2012. The song peaked at number 5 on the Swedish Singles Chart.

Track listing
Digital download
 "Mitt hjärta blöder" - 3:20
 "Mitt hjärta blöder" (Walz Guld Remix) - 3:18
 "Dumpa mig" (2012 Version) - 3:50

Credits and personnel
Lead vocals – Veronica Maggio
Producers – Christian Walz
Music/Lyrics – Christian Walz, Veronica Maggio
Label: Universal Music

Charts

Weekly charts

Year-end charts

Release history

References

2012 singles
Veronica Maggio songs
Songs written by Christian Walz
2011 songs
Universal Music Group singles
Songs written by Veronica Maggio